Henry Bell Cisnero (born July 27, 1982 in Cuba) is a Cuban volleyball player. He is 188 cm and plays as spiker. He plays for Maccabi Tel Aviv  He was part of the Cuba men's national volleyball team at the 2010 FIVB Volleyball Men's World Championship in Italy. He played for Santiago de Cuba in 2010.

References

External links
 Yenry Bell Cisnero at the International Volleyball Federation (2012)
 Yenry Bell Cisnero at the International Volleyball Federation (2010)
 
 Henry Bell Cisnero at WorldofVolley
 Henry Bell at Volleybox.net

1982 births
Living people
Cuban men's volleyball players
Volleyball players at the 2011 Pan American Games
Galatasaray S.K. (men's volleyball) players
Pan American Games silver medalists for Cuba
Pan American Games medalists in volleyball
Medalists at the 2011 Pan American Games
21st-century Cuban people